is an original 1997 Japanese anime television series from et, with animation by Studio Deen, and produced by d-rights and BeStack. The title is a mix of Japanese and German.

The North American release by Bandai Entertainment (then AnimeVillage) used only the German "Ehrgeiz" which, when translated into English, means "ambition".  The show was originally aired late at night (being the first TV mecha anime to do so) on TV Tokyo; however, Ehrgeiz was eventually re-run on the cable/satellite channel AT-X in 1999.

Story 
Earth started space colonization by creating the Next Colonies. The Next forces later rebelled, and created the Next Government. The rebellion became a war, and the multi-purpose Metal Vehicles, MVs for short, were changed for battle purposes. Meanwhile, Terra, an Earth Rebellion force, started creating more trouble for Earth. Now, a mysterious MV-like being, S.A.C ("S" for short), is loose, and Next wants it so that they can win the war. Terra's psychic leader, Hal, has been sensing "S", and wants to know more about the power it has. The future of these three groups will be up to a bunch of outlaws who live on the abandoned Next 7 colony, though no one knows that yet....

Main characters 

 
The "Hero" of the story and the leader of the Next 7 outlaws. He was once a member of the Next forces, as an MV pilot.

 
A "cool" businessman type.

 
A former Next forces soldier.

 
Anne's brother. His parents were killed in the battle of "Next 7".

 
Ken's sister. Her parents were killed in the battle of "Next 7".

 
An MV developer. Formerly an MV pilot for Earth's military.

 
Characterized by his pouty lips. Also a former MV pilot for Earth's military.

 
Captain of the Next forces.

 
A Next forces cyborg. S.A.C. was developed to capture his bodily tissues.

 
The leader of the Revolutionary Organization TERRA on Earth. He is a psychic.

 
Hal's bodyguard.

 
Akane's subordinate. Killed in action as soon as he is introduced.

Mecha 

 Stands for "Metal Vehicle". This is how all piloted robots are referred to in the series (i.e. "Jay's M.V.)

 S.A.C. is mounted in an unmanned, state-of-the-art MV. S.A.C. stands for "System of Absolutely Conscience". This powerful M.V. is sought after by the Next forces throughout the series.

Staff

Media

VHS, LaserDisc & streaming
VHS tapes and LaserDiscs of Ehrgeiz were released by Bandai Visual (under their Emotion label) with the first volume released on May 25, 1998, the second on June 25, the third on July 25, the fourth on August 25, the fifth on September 25, and the sixth on October 25, all in the same year.

In 1999, AnimeVillage.com (later Bandai Entertainment) began releasing subtitled VHS volumes of the anime. The first two volumes released in November and December (respectively) of that year, and the final four volumes released between January and March 2000. A single dubbed VHS tape of the first two episodes was also released by AnimeVillage. However, likely due to poor sales of the subbed tapes, AnimeVillage later cancelled the English dubbed version. 

All 12 episodes of Ehrgeiz were later made legally available for digital streaming via the Bandai Channel, courtesy of Bandai Visual. Currently, the series has no DVD or Blu-Ray release in either Japan or North America.

Themes
Opening theme
"Dream Jack" by HUMMING BIRD
Episodes 1-12
Ending theme
"One Voice for EHRGEIZ" by Mariko Fukui
Episodes 1-12

References

External links 
Japanese
 Ehrgeiz DMM.com page
 allcinema.com Ehrgeiz page.

English
 Official d-rights Site
 

Action anime and manga
Mecha anime and manga
Studio Deen